Choanomphalus aorus is a species of freshwater air-breathing snail, an aquatic pulmonate gastropod mollusk in the family Planorbidae, the ram's horn snails, or planorbids.

Distribution 
This species is found in Lake Baikal, Russia and in Angara River.

Description
The width of the shell is 5 mm; the height of the shell is 3 mm.

References

External links
 

Planorbidae
Gastropods described in 1860